Hotel Sofitel Tokyo (ホテルソフィテル東京) was a hotel high-rise building (106.07 m, 3 underground storeys) in Taito-ku, Tokyo (1-48, 2 Ikenohata, Taito-ku, Tokyo, Japan). It was established in 1994 as Hotel Cosima with 71 rooms on 26 cantilever floors. In 1999 it was  purchased by Accor Group.  After refurbishment  (number of rooms increased to 83) it was reopened as 4-star hotel in September 2000, closed in December 2006 and was demolished between February 2007 and May 2008.

Hotel Sofitel was a late work of Japanese architect Kiyonori Kikutake (66 years old, when the building was conceived), best known for his own pre-metabolist house (Sky House), and Edo-Tokyo Museum(1993). Hotel Sofitel building resembled some metabolist ideas (as Joint Core, capsules, modularity, and - theoretically - the possibility of replacement of its parts). The building shows a direct similarity to Kiyonori Kikutake's earlier theoretical project "Tree-shaped Community" from 1968. However, this project consisted of a group of towers cross-shaped in the plan, it shows also a similarity to other metabolists projects (Nakagin Capsule Tower by Kisho Kurokawa, Shizuoka Press and Broadcasting Tower by Kenzo Tange).

It is said that the characteristic shape of the hotel building was inspired by shapes Japanese temples and pine trees. Despite some metabolist-like features the object itself cannot be seen as representative of metabolist movement - as designed long after the slow breakup of the metabolists group in late 70. of XXc. The object referenced traditional Japanese architecture, which is characteristic of mature and late works of K.Kikutake (Edo-Tokyo Museum, Izumo Grand Shrine Administration Building, Toukouen Hotel).

References

Bibliography
Kisho Kurokawa, "The Origin and History of the Metabolist Movement" - Charles Jencks, Kisho Kurokawa. Studio Vista, 1976
Botond Bognar, "Beyond the Bubble: Contemporary Japanese Architecture"; Phaidon, 2008
Kurt Helfrich, William Whitaker, "Crafting a Modern World: The Architecture and Design of Antonin and Noémi Raymond"; Princeton Architectural Press, 2006
Mark Mulligan "Kiyonori Kikutake Structuring the Future" Kiyonori Kikutake: Structuring the Future

Hotels in Tokyo
Hotel buildings completed in 1994
Demolished buildings and structures in Japan
1994 establishments in Japan
Hotels disestablished in 2007
Demolished hotels
Buildings and structures demolished in 2008
Defunct hotels in Japan
Former skyscrapers
Buildings and structures in Taitō